Diego Nunes may refer to:

 Diego Nunes (racing driver), Brazilian racing driver
 Diego Nunes (fighter), Brazilian mixed martial artist